Coleophora peribenanderi is a moth of the family Coleophoridae.

Description

The wingspan is 12.5–15 mm. it is one of a number of Coleophora species with longitudinal forewing white/pale streaks and with oblique streaks on or between veins extending to the costa and without scattered fuscous scales. Only reliably identified by dissection and microscopic examination of the genitalia.  

Adults are on wing from June to July.

The larvae form a case beneath a leaf of a Carduus or Cirsium species, although Arctium, Carlina and Centaurea may sometimes be used. They create a yellow-brown to light grey tubular silken case with darker length lines of up to 17 mm. The rear end is three-valved and the mouth angle is about 50°. The larva feeds at the underside of the leaf. Full-grown cases can be found from September to October. After hibernation, the larvae usually does not feed anymore and pupates.

Description
It has been recorded from Ireland, Great Britain, France, Spain, Italy, Belgium, the Netherlands, Germany, Denmark, Fennoscandia, Poland, the Baltic region, Ukraine, southern and central Russia, Bulgaria, Romania, Slovakia, Greece, Czech Republic, Hungary as well as the Near East.

References

External links
 
  Bestimmungshilfe für die in Europa nachgewiesenen Schmetterlingsarten
 UKmoths

peribenanderi
Moths of Asia
Moths of Europe
Moths described in 1943